Jalen Pickett (born October 22, 1999) is an American college basketball player for the Penn State Nittany Lions of the Big Ten Conference. He previously played for the Siena Saints. He is a graduate of SPIRE Institute and Academy, an Olympic training center in Geneva, Ohio.

High school career
Pickett played high school basketball for the Aquinas Institute in Rochester, New York. In his junior season, he led his team to a New York State Public High School Athletic Association (NYSPHSAA) Class AA championship while earning most valuable player (MVP) honors. As a senior, Pickett averaged 20 points and 10 rebounds per game, reaching the Class AA Federation Final. He played for the Albany-based program City Rocks on the Amateur Athletic Union (AAU) circuit and was teammates with five-star recruit Isaiah Stewart. Playing for the City Rocks, Pickett led the Nike Elite Youth Basketball League in player efficiency. For academic reasons, he completed a postgraduate year, during which he played for SPIRE Institute in Geneva, Ohio. Pickett averaged 14 points, 6.3 rebounds, 4.6 assists and 2.1 steals per game. He became academically eligible to play in the National Collegiate Athletic Association (NCAA). Pickett was considered a three-star recruit by Rivals and received few offers from NCAA Division I programs. He committed to Siena to play for first-year head coach Jamion Christian.

College career

On February 17, 2019, Pickett had a career-high 46 points and 13 assists in a 107–100 triple overtime loss to Quinnipiac. Pickett was named Metro Atlantic Athletic Conference Rookie of the Week 11 times, a league record. As a freshman, Pickett averaged 15.8 points, 4.6 rebounds, 2.1 steals and 6.7 assists per game, which ranked ninth nationally. Pickett was named First-team All-MAAC and MAAC Rookie of the Year. After the season he declared for the 2019 NBA draft and participated in the G League Elite Camp but ultimately decided to return to Siena.

Pickett missed a game against Colgate on November 30, for a violation of team rules. On February 14, 2020, he scored a season-high 27 points in a 73–64 win over Rider. At the close of the 2019–20 regular season, Pickett was named the MAAC Player of the Year. He helped the team win the MAAC regular season championship, averaging 15.1 points and a league-leading 6 assists per game while shooting 37.4 percent from three-point range. As a junior, Pickett was limited by a hamstring injury and multiple COVID-19 pauses, averaging 12.9 points, 6.3 rebounds and 4.8 assists per game. He earned First Team  All-MAAC honors for his third consecutive season.

On April 25, 2021, Pickett announced that he would transfer to Penn State, choosing the Nittany Lions over Oregon State. He averaged 13.3 points, 4.3 rebounds, 4.4 assists, and 1.1 steals per game. Pickett announced he would return for his final season of eligibility.

On February 14, 2023, Pickett scored a career-high 41 points in a 93-81 victory over Illinois, becoming Penn State's first 40-point scorer since 1961 and setting a Bryce Jordan Center record. He also became the fourth Penn State player to score 2,000 points. Pickett followed up his historic performance with a 32-point performance against Minnesota on February 18, 2023. His combined 2-game totals of 73 points, 16 assists and 11 rebounds earned him multiple national player-of-the-week honors. The two-game stat line was also only the third time over the last 25 seasons in NCAA Division I Basketball or the NBA where a player scored 70+ points, had 15+ assists and 10+ rebounds with a 65% field goal percentage and 90% free-throw rate. The other two players to accomplish this feat were LeBron James (2017) and Stephen Curry (2022).

Career statistics

College

|-
| style="text-align:left;"| 2018–19
| style="text-align:left;"| Siena
| 33 || 32 || 37.1 || .436 || .348 || .746 || 4.6 || 6.7 || 2.0 || 0.9 || 15.8
|-
| style="text-align:left;"| 2019–20
| style="text-align:left;"| Siena
| 29 || 28 || 37.0 || .458 || .374 || .689 || 4.6 || 6.0 || 1.0 || 1.1 || 15.1
|-
| style="text-align:left;"| 2020–21
| style="text-align:left;"| Siena
| 14 || 14 || 36.1 || .403 || .359 || .750 || 6.3 || 4.8 || 0.9 || 1.1 || 12.9
|- class="sortbottom"
| style="text-align:center;" colspan="2"| Career (Siena)
| 76 || 74 || 36.9 || .439 || .360 || .730 || 4.9 || 6.1 || 1.4 || 1.0 || 15.0
|-
| style="text-align:left;"| 2021–22
| style="text-align:left;"| Penn State
| 31 || 31 || 37.2 || .420 || .320 || .746 || 4.3 || 4.4 || 1.1 || 0.6 || 13.3
|-
| style="text-align:left;"| 2022–23
| style="text-align:left;"| Penn State
| 36 || 36 || 36.5 || .511 || .385 || .774 || 7.3 || 6.7 || 0.9 || 0.5 || 17.9
|- class="sortbottom"
| style="text-align:center;" colspan="2"| Career (Penn State)
| 67 || 67 || 36.9 || .466 || .353 || .760 || 5.8 || 5.6 || 1.0 || 0.6 || 15.6

References

External links
Penn State Nittany Lions bio
Siena Saints bio

1999 births
Living people
21st-century African-American sportspeople
African-American basketball players
All-American college men's basketball players
American men's basketball players
Basketball players from New York (state)
Penn State Nittany Lions basketball players
Point guards
Siena Saints men's basketball players
Sportspeople from Rochester, New York